Joseph Bergin (born 22 September 1987) is an Irish hurler who plays for Offaly Championship club Seir Kieran. He was a member of the Offaly senior hurling team for 14 seasons, during which time he usually lined out as a full-forward.

Playing career

Seir Kieran

Bergin joined the Seir Kieran club at a young age and played in all grades at juvenile and underage levels, enjoying championship success in the under-21 grade in 2008.

Offaly

Minor and under-21

Bergin first played for Offaly as a member of the minor team during the 2004 Leinster Championship. He made his first appearance on 10 April when he came on as a 23rd-minute substitute for Colin O'Meara in a 0-14 to 1-10 defeat of Laois.

Bergin was again eligible for the minor team for the 2005 Leinster Championship, however, his tenure in the grade ended without success.

Bergin progressed onto the Offaly under-21 team during the 2006 Leinster Championship. He made his first appearance on 21 June when he scored two points in 0-17 to 1-11 defeat by Dublin.

On 18 June 2007, Bergin lined out in the Leinster final. He scored 1-01 from full-forward in the 2-18 to 3-09 defeat by Dublin.

Bergin lined out at full-forward in a second consecutive Leinster final on 24 July 2008. He top scored for Offaly with 2-01 in the 2-21 to 2-09 defeat by Kilkenny. It was his last game in the grade.

Senior

Bergin was just 18-years-old when he was added to the Offaly senior team for the 2006 National League. He made his first appearance on 19 February and scored 1-01 in a 1-21 to 2-18 draw with Cork. Bergin made his first appearance in the Leinster Championship on 21 May. He scored 1-01 from full-forward in 2-12 to 0-08 defeat of Laois.

On 3 May 2009, Bergin lined out at full-forward when Offaly faced Wexford in the National League Division 2 final. In spite of being held scoreless he collected a winners' medal following the 1-13 to 0-13 victory.

On 15 January 2020, Bergin announced his retirement from inter-county hurling.

Leinster

Bergin was selected for the Leinster inter-provincial team for the first time during the 2007 Championship. He made his first appearance on 14 October and scored a goal in the 2-19 to 0-12 defeat of Ulster in the semi-final. Bergin was switched to full-forward for the final against Connacht on 28 October. He scored 1-03 from play and collected a Railway Cup winners' medal after the 1-23 to 0-17 victory.

On 1 November 2008, Bergin was an unused substitute when Leinster faced Munster in the 2008 Railway Cup final. He collected a winners' medal following the 1-15 to 1-12 victory.

Bergin returned to the Leinster starting fifteen during the 2009 Championship. On 14 March, he was at full-forward when Leinster faced Connacht in the final. Bergin scored 1-01 and collected a third winners' medal after the 3-18 to 1-17 victory.

After the championship's two-year absence, Bergin was again included on the Leinster team for the 2012 Championship. On 4 March, he scored two points from centre-forward when Leinster defeated Connacht by 2-19 to 1-15 to win the title.

On 1 March 2014, Bergin was included as a substitute on the Leinster team that faced Connacht in the Railway Cup final. He was introduced as a substitute for Jack Guiney and collected a fifth winners' medal following a 1-23 to 0-16 victory.

Career statistics

Honours

Seir Kieran
 Offaly Intermediate Hurling Championship (1): 2019
 Offaly Under-21 A Hurling Championship (1): 2008
 Offaly Senior Hurling League (Pat Carroll Cup) (2): 2011, 2016
 Offaly Senior 'B' Hurling Championship (1): 2019

Offaly
National Hurling League Division 2 (1): 2009

Leinster
Railway Cup (5): 2006, 2008, 2009, 2012, 2014

Ireland
Shinty/Hurling International Series (2): 2009, 2011

References

External links
Joe Bergin profile at the Offaly GAA website

1987 births
Living people
Seir Kieran hurlers
Offaly inter-county hurlers
Leinster inter-provincial hurlers